Guillermo "Memo" Luna Romero (June 25, 1930 – November 9, 2021) was a Mexican professional baseball player, a left-handed pitcher whose career extended from 1949 through 1961 and who pitched one game of Major League Baseball for the 1954 St. Louis Cardinals. Luna was born in Mexico City.

Luna had two seasons in the minor leagues. In 1951, he led the Class C Southwest International League in strikeouts (318) and earned run average (2.52) while posting a 26–13 won–lost record for the sixth-place Tijuana Potros. Two years later, Luna led the Open-Classification Pacific Coast League in earned run average (2.67), as he won 17 of 29 decisions for the 1953 San Diego Padres. That performance earned him a trial with the 1954 Cardinals.

Luna started the Redbirds' sixth contest of the season, at Busch Stadium against the Cincinnati Redlegs, but he faced only six batters in the top of the first inning. He walked Bobby Adams; then Roy McMillan hit a double, with Adams scoring on an error by Rip Repulski, which also allowed McMillan to advance to third base. Luna retired Gus Bell on a fly ball, then got another out when Jim Greengrass hit a sacrifice fly to score McMillan. With two outs and the bases empty, however, Luna gave up another double, to Ted Kluszewski, and another walk, to Johnny Temple. He then was replaced by relief pitcher Mel Wright, who prevented further scoring. The two runs allowed by Luna, however, were enough to saddle him with the loss in an eventual 13–6 Cincinnati win. (The Redlegs' winning pitcher was Joe Nuxhall).

Luna was sent down to the Triple-A Rochester Red Wings after that one appearance, and never returned to the Majors. In 1988 he was selected to the Mexican Professional Baseball Hall of Fame.

References

External links

1930 births
2021 deaths
Alijadores de Tampico players
Baseball players from Mexico City
Indios de Ciudad Juárez (minor league) players
Industriales de Monterrey players
Major League Baseball pitchers
Major League Baseball players from Mexico
Mexican expatriate baseball players in the United States
Mexican League baseball pitchers
Omaha Cardinals players
Petroleros de Poza Rica players
Potros de Tijuana players
Rochester Red Wings players
San Antonio Missions players
San Diego Padres (minor league) players
St. Louis Cardinals players
Tecolotes de Nuevo Laredo players
Tigres del México players